Pectinivalva warburtonensis is a moth of the family Nepticulidae. It is found on the Warburton Ranges in Western Australia.

The wingspan is about 5.5 mm for males and females.

The host plant is unknown, but probably a Myrtaceae species. They probably mine the leaves of their host plant.

External links
Australian Faunal Directory
Australian Nepticulidae (Lepidoptera): Redescription of the named species

Moths of Australia
Nepticulidae
Moths described in 1939